Aamani is an Indian actress who has predominantly appeared in Telugu films in addition to a few Tamil and Kannada films. She made her debut in a lead role opposite Naresh in the Telugu film Jamba Lakidi Pamba (1992), directed by E. V. V. Satyanarayana. The film turned out to be a blockbuster.

She starred in the film Mister Pellam (1993) directed by Bapu, which won the National Film Award for Best Feature Film in Telugu.  She won Filmfare Award for Best Actress – Telugu for the film Subha Lagnam (1994) and Nandi Award for Best Actress for the films Subha Sankalpam (1995) and Mr. Pellam (1993).

Film career
Aamani was born in Bengaluru. She started her career doing small roles in films like Aadadhi, Chandamama Kathalu, and others. Subsequently, she was paired as the lead actress opposite actors like Vishnuvardhan, Nagarjuna, Balakrishna, Krishna, Mammootty, Arvind Swami, Jagapathi Babu and Kamal Haasan. She won Filmfare Award for Best Actress – Telugu for the film Subha Lagnam  & Nandi Award for Best Actress for the films Subha Sankalpam & Mister Pellam. After a hiatus of many years, she appeared in the film Aa Naluguru.

Aamani played a street vendor and actor Kartikeya’s onscreen mother in a 2021 Telugu-language romantic comedy-drama titled Chaavu Kaburu Challaga.

She is seen playing the money lender Kanaka Ratnam in Muthyamantha Muddu.

In the 1990s, Aamani appeared in films that were successful such as Amma Donga, Vamshanikokkadu, Subha Lagnam, Jamba Lakidi Pamba, and Nakshatra Poratam.

In 2021 she made a guest appearance in a Telugu reality show Drama Juniors.

Personal life 
Her niece, Hrithika Srinivas is also an actress who made her acting debut with a Telugu-Tamil bilingual film titled Allantha Duraana.

Filmography

Television

References

External links
 
 Aamani Biography with Rare Photos and Videos 
cineherald.com - Amani pics

Actresses in Telugu cinema
Indian film actresses
Living people
Year of birth missing (living people)
Actresses from Bangalore
Filmfare Awards South winners
Nandi Award winners
Actresses in Kannada cinema
20th-century Indian actresses
21st-century Indian actresses